Petri Juhani Huru (born 19 September 1966 in Pori) is a Finnish politician currently serving in the Parliament of Finland for the Finns Party at the Satakunta constituency.

References

1966 births
Living people
People from Pori
Finns Party politicians
Members of the Parliament of Finland (2019–23)